Odostomia scalaris is a species of sea snail, a marine gastropod mollusk in the family Pyramidellidae, the pyrams and their allies.

Distribution

This species occurs in the following locations:
 Azores Exclusive Economic Zone
 Baltic sea
 Belgian Exclusive Economic Zone
 British Isles
 Dutch Exclusive  Economic Zone
 European waters (ERMS scope)
 Greek Exclusive Economic Zone
 Irish Exclusive economic Zone
 Portuguese Exclusive Economic Zone
 Spanish Exclusive Economic Zone
 United Kingdom Exclusive Economic Zone
 Wimereux
 Atlantic Ocean off Mauritania at depths between 34 m and 114 m.

Notes
Additional information regarding this species:
 Classification: According to Heppell (in McKay & Smith 1979) it is preferably to use  Odostomia rissoides  Hanley, 1844 instead of  Odostomia scalaris , while Van Aartsen prefers the senior name Odostomia scalaris.

References

External links
 To Biodiversity Heritage Library (36 publications)
 To CLEMAM
 To Encyclopedia of Life
 To USNM Invertebrate Zoology Mollusca Collection
 To ITIS
 To World Register of Marine Species

scalaris
Gastropods described in 1843